Ludza is a city in Latvia.

Ludza may also refer to:
Ludza (river)
Ludza Municipality
Ludza Castle
Ludza District
Ludza dialect

See also